= Mediaquest Corporation =

- Company type: Publisher
- Industry: Publishing
- Founded: 1987
- Headquarters: Dubai
- Area served: Middle East & North Africa
- Key people: Alexandre and Julien Hawari, Co-CEOs
- Number of employees: 150
- Website: www.mediaquestcorp.com

Mediaquest Corporation is a privately owned publishing house based in Dubai in the United Arab Emirates. In 2011 the business publication Saneou Al Hadath, a Mediaquest property, rated Dubai the "Best Arab City to Live in."

Mediaquest was founded in Paris in 1987. It primarily serves the Middle East and North African (MENA) markets. In January 2008 the company acquired the Gulf Marketing Review, Al Tasweeq Al Arabi and Raceweek titles from Gray Business Communications. Other titles include Trends, Saneou Al Hadath, Arabies and Communicate. As of 2012 the company had about 150 employees. Magazines are published in Arabic, English, and French.

The company runs a news web site and an online business magazine. "Dotmena", a subsidiary founded in 2010, is an online advertising network that runs ads on over 2,000 websites. This includes sites run by Mediaquest and other sites such as Eurosport Arabia, Beirut Night Life, Auto Middle East and France 24.
